Brixton protests may refer to:

 1981 Brixton riot – 11 April 1981
 1985 Brixton riot – 28 September 1985
 1995 Brixton riot – 13 December 1995
 2011 Brixton riot – 7 August 2011; see 2011 London riots
 2015 Reclaim Brixton protest, anti-gentrification protests, resulting in minor disorder